Hugh Davidson is an American actor, writer, and producer, best known for his work on the Adult Swim television series Robot Chicken.

Career
Davidson made his motion picture debut in the 2001 film Pledge of Innocence. He later guest starred on television shows such as Reno 911!, Arrested Development and Will and Grace and as himself in the Mike Tyson Mysteries episode "Unsolved Situations", which he also produces.

In 2006, Davidson went to work as a voice actor and writer for Robot Chicken, for which he won a Primetime Emmy Award in 2010. He also worked as a voice actor and writer for the Adult Swim show Saul of the Mole Men. He wrote three episodes of the series, and starred as the voice of Bertrum Burrows. In 2008, Davidson starred as Thomas Jefferson in the Adult Swim special Young Person's Guide to History. He also voiced characters on the TV show Mad as a series regular and one of the principal cast members.

Davidson is an alumnus of The Groundlings, an improvisational and sketch comedy troupe based in Los Angeles, California.

Davidson was a writer and story editor for The Looney Tunes Show and a producer for Mike Tyson Mysteries.
Davidson produced the short-lived TV Land series, Nobodies. Davidson, along with Larry Dorf and Rachel Ramras, executive produced, wrote and starred in the series. Melissa McCarthy and Ben Falcone also starred in the project.  Mike McDonald is the showrunner. More recently, he signed an overall deal with Warner Bros. Animation.

Filmography

References

External links

Living people
Place of birth missing (living people)
Year of birth missing (living people)
American male film actors
American male television actors
American television writers
American male television writers
American male voice actors
Annie Award winners
Date of birth missing (living people)